John Gilbert Luce (December 16, 1862 – May 11, 1935) was an American banker and politician who represented Goochland and Fluvanna counties in the Virginia House of Delegates.

References

External links 

1862 births
1935 deaths
Democratic Party members of the Virginia House of Delegates
20th-century American politicians